Petar Čuić (born 2 June 1999) is a Croatian footballer who plays as a defender for Septemvri Sofia.

Club career
Čuić joined the GNK Dinamo Zagreb Academy in 2015 and rose through the ranks from the club’s Under-15 squad to the reserve team by the start of 2018. Čuić made his debut in the Croatian Second Football League with GNK Dinamo Zagreb II in April 2018, making two appearances in the latter stages of the club’s 2017-18 campaign. Čuić became a regular in the Dinamo Zagreb II lineup in the second half of the 2018-19 season, making 15 appearances before playing in a further 14 games in the opening period of the 2019-20 season – tallying his first league goal against NK Međimurje on Sept. 21, 2019.

Earlier in the year, Čuić helped Dinamo Zagreb’s U-23 side advance to the Premier League International Cup final by beating Southampton F.C.   3-1 in the semifinal, with Čuić coming off the bench to tally the final goal of the game. During the club’s Under-19 UEFA Youth League appearance in 2016, Čuić started in one game, helping his side claim a 1-0 victory on the road against Italian giants Juventus F.C. on Dec. 7, 2016.

On January 22, 2020, the Croatian signed, alongside teammate Dominik Rešetar, joined USL Championship side Sporting Kansas City II on loan ahead of the 2020 season. Following the 2021 season, Kansas City opted to declined their purchase option on Čuić.

Čuić joined USL Championship side FC Tulsa in January 2022 ahead of their upcoming season.

International career
Internationally, Čuić has represented Croatia’s Under-16 and Under-19 National Teams, making his debut for the U-19s in a friendly against Italy on Nov. 8, 2016.

References

1999 births
Living people
Footballers from Zagreb
Association football defenders
Croatian footballers
GNK Dinamo Zagreb players
Sporting Kansas City II players
FC Tulsa players
First Football League (Croatia) players
USL Championship players
Croatian expatriate footballers
Expatriate soccer players in the United States
Croatian expatriate sportspeople in the United States